This is a list of killings and massacres committed in Mandatory Palestine. It is restricted to incidents in which at least three people were deliberately killed. This list does not include unlawful deaths due to criminal activity. It includes all casualties that resulted from the initial attack on civilians or non-combat military personnel.

Note: The designation "responsible party" below refers to those believed to be the principle instigators of the violence. Where culpability is disputed or ambiguous, the sources cited support the chosen designation.

Individual massacres during the 1936–1939 Arab revolt in Palestine are listed below. In total, during the course of these events, between September 27, 1937 – 1939, 5,000 Arabs, 415 Jews and several hundred Britons were killed.

List of killings and massacres committed in Mandate Palestine

See also

Killings and massacres during the 1948 Palestine War
List of massacres in Israel
List of villages depopulated during the Arab-Israeli conflict
List of Irgun attacks during the 1930s
List of Palestinian suicide attacks
Palestinian political violence

References

Sources
 
 

1948 Arab–Israeli War
Palestinian terrorism
Zionist terrorism
Terrorism in Mandatory Palestine
Terrorist incidents in the 1920s
Terrorist incidents in the 1930s
Terrorist incidents in Asia in the 1940s
Mandatory Palestine-related lists
 
Mandatory Palestine